Pyraloides is a monotypic moth genus of the family Noctuidae. Its only species, Pyraloides spodia, is found in Egypt. Both the genus and species were first described by Rebel in 1948.

References

External links
Original description: 

Acontiinae
Monotypic moth genera